Rollins College is a private college in Winter Park, Florida.  It was founded in November 1885 and has about 30 undergraduate majors and several graduate programs. It is Florida's fourth oldest post-secondary institution.

History
Rollins College is Florida's fourth oldest post-secondary institution, and has been independent, nonsectarian, and coeducational from conception. Lucy Cross, founder of the Daytona Institute for Young Women in 1880, first placed the matter of establishing a college in Florida before the Congregational Churches in 1884. In 1885, the church put her on the committee in charge of determining the location of their first college in Florida. Cross is known as the "Mother of Rollins College." Rollins was incorporated, organized, and named in the Lyman Park building in nearby Sanford, Florida, on April 28, 1885, opening for classes in Winter Park on November 4 of that year. It was established by New England Congregationalists who sought to bring their style of liberal arts education to the frontier St. John's basin. A commemorative plaque listing the names of the founders was dedicated 1 March 1954 and is displayed in historic Downtown Sanford.

Early benefactors of Rollins College included Chicago businessman Alonzo Rollins (1832-1887), for whom the college is named.  Rollins made substantial donations to enable the founding of the college, and was a trustee and its first treasurer.

Another early benefactor was Franklin Fairbanks of St. Johnsbury, Vermont.  Fairbanks was president of the family business, Fairbanks Scales, and was a founder of Winter Park, a donor to Rollins College and a trustee.

In March of 1936 during a visit to Central Florida, U.S. president Franklin D. Roosevelt was conferred an honorary degree in literature at the Knowles Chapel on campus. Other U.S. presidents who have visited the campus include Calvin Coolidge (1930), Harry Truman (1949), Ronald Reagan (1976; prior to his 1980 election), and Barack Obama (2012).

Firing of John Andrew Rice and required loyalty pledge
President Hamilton Holt decided to require all professors to make a "loyalty pledge" to keep their jobs. In March 1933, Holt fired John Andrew Rice, an atheist scholar and unorthodox teacher, whom Holt had hired, along with three other "golden personalities" (as Holt called them), in his push to put Rollins on the cutting edge of innovative education, for refusing to sign the loyalty pledge. The American Association of University Professors censured Rollins.  The widely publicized case was investigated by the American Association of University Professors, and it is known as the "Rollins College Case" among historians of tenure. The four fired faculty quickly founded experimental Black Mountain College, with a gift from a former Rollins College faculty member.

Okinawa statue
In October 1994, the school made international headlines when the government of Japan, per the request of its Okinawa Prefecture, asked for the return of a statue that was taken as war loot after the Battle of Okinawa in 1945 by Clinton C. Nichols, at that time, a lieutenant commander in the United States Navy and a Rollins alum.  Nichols had presented the statue of Ninomiya Sontoku, a prominent 19th-century Japanese agricultural leader, philosopher, moralist, and economist, to then-President Hamilton Holt, who promised to keep the statue permanently in the main lobby of the Warren Administration Building. At first, the school rejected the offer made by Okinawan officials, who suggested that a replica of the statue will be presented to the school if the original was returned to the island. After consulting both with the U.S. State Department and the school's board of trustees, then-President Rita Bornstein accepted the offer and the statue was returned to Okinawa in 1995 in commemoration of the 50th anniversary of the end of World War II. In addition to providing the school with a replica of the original statue, the government of Okinawa and Rollins signed "an agreement of cooperation" that pledges to develop additional cooperative projects between the college and Shogaku Junior and Senior High School, the Okinawan school where the original statue has been placed.

Campus

The  campus contains a range of amenities, including a theater for performing arts; the Cornell Campus Center; and the Alfond Sports Center. The college is located in a picturesque setting in Winter Park, FL right across from Park Avenue.

Architecture 
The Rollins campus is well known for its highly decorative Spanish and Mediterranean Revival style architecture. According to College Historian and Professor Emeritus Jack C. Lane, the Spanish-Mediterranean style blended best with the natural environment of Florida, and that Rollins 8th president Hamilton Holt felt "the college's unified curriculum should be reflected in the architectural style." Lane goes on to state that Rollins' campus architecture has stayed consistent since its opening, and that "the college has been extremely fortunate to have leaders who recognized the significance of architectural style for the educational process. By making certain that new buildings retained a harmony of design, these leaders left present and future generations a deeply profound legacy: architectural beauty and unity create a spiritual sense of place that inspires the entire educational and social life of a college."

Pugsley Hall & Mayflower Hall
In 1930, President Holt announced the gifts of Cornelius Pugsley and an anonymous donor for the construction of two women's dormitories, with their interiors designed by Virginia Huntington Robie. Pugsley and Mayflower Halls were dedicated in 1931. Mayflower Hall received its name from the Pilgrim ship. The Society of Friends at Chalfont St. Giles, Buckinghamshire, gave Rollins a 16-inch section of beam from the ship, which, it had been discovered, had been salvaged to build a haybarn in England. The block of wood was placed above the fireplace in Mayflower Hall. Tau Kappa Epsilon fraternity moved into Pugsley Hall in 1997 and have occupied it all but one academic year since. In the 1990s, there were rows of shrubbery on either side of the sidewalk leading up to Pugsley Hall, which sits at the end of Park Avenue.

Chase Hall
Chase Hall was built in 1908. It was first used as a men's dormitory until 1966. From 1966 until 1999 it was used by the Sigma Phi Epsilon fraternity, followed by the Phi Delta Theta fraternity. The Lucy Cross Center for Women and Their Allies was established in 2010 at Rollins College in Chase Hall, Room 205. The center is named after Lucy Cross, the "Mother of Rollins College" (see above).

Cross Hall
Cross Hall is named after Lucy Cross, the "Mother of Rollins College" (see above).

Hooker Hall 
Hooker Hall was named after, the first president of Rollins College, Edward Payson Hooker (1838-1904). The building was originally used as housing for the Theta Kappa Nu fraternity then, in 1939, the Lambda Chi Alpha fraternity moved in. Hooker was a Chi Psi at Middlebury College (Mu '54) and played an integral part in bringing the Chi Psi chapter, Alpha Mu Delta, to Rollins in 1977. Today, Hooker Hall is home to the Chi Psi fraternity, and is known to many faculty and students as The Chi Psi Lodge.

Pinehurst Cottage
The Rollins College website states that Pinehurst Cottage and Knowles I, the two structures established when the college founded, suffered a fire in 1909 which destroyed Knowles Hall and scorched Pinehurst's exterior. Pinehurst, originally a women's residence hall, over the years transformed into a men's dormitory, co-ed dormitory, the home of President Ward, a Library, chemistry lab, infirmary and then classroom. In November 1985, Pinehurst received Winter Park's Historic Preservation Commission's Historic Landmark award. The college renovated to maintain the building's original appearance. Today, Pinehurst is a co-ed residence hall that houses a special interest group which promotes academic fulfillment outside the classroom.

Alfond Boathouse
Built in 1988 to fulfill the Rollins College waterski and sailing teams' needs. The Alfond Boathouse sits on lake Virginia and has a total of 3 offices used by the waterski and sailing coaches, as well as a classroom, boat bay and observation deck. The exterior was renovated in 2016.

Peace Monument

Erected in 1938 and dedicated on Armistice Day by college president Hamilton Holt, it consists of a German artillery shell, surrendered by Germany at the end of the First World War, mounted on a pedestal, bearing this inscription:

Pause, passerby and hang your head in shame

This Engine of Destruction, Torture and Death Symbolizes:
The Prostitution of the Inventor
The Avarice of the Manufacturer
The Blood-guilt of the statesman
The Savagery of the Soldier
The Perverted Patriotism of the Citizen
The Debasement of the Human Race

That it can be Employed as an Instrument of Defense of Liberty, Justice and Right in Nowise Invalidates the Truth of the Words Here Graven.

—Hamilton Holt

The top half of the monument was stolen by vandals during World War II, but the plaque from the bottom half survives and is in the stairwell leading to the second floor of the Mills Memorial building.

In 2000, the Rollins College's Peace Monument was featured in a New York Times article.

Winter Park Institute
The Winter Park Institute, located in the Osceola Lodge on Interlachen Avenue, brings scholars, leaders, and artists from diverse fields of disciplines and expertise to the Rollins campus for symposiums, seminars, lectures, interviews, exhibits, readings, and master classes that are always free and open to the public. Following the legacy began by President Hamilton Holt and continued by President Hugh McKean, the Institute launched in the fall of 2008, the first guest being U.S. poet laureate Billy Collins, who has returned every year since. Other guests include Robert F. Kennedy Jr., Ken Burns, Gloria Steinem, Jane Goodall, Paul Simon, Itzhak Perlman, Nicholas Kristof, Sheryl Wu Dunn, Jane Pauley, and most recently, Sir Paul McCartney.

Olin Library
Rollins' Olin Library was dedicated in 1985, with a US$4.7 million grant from the F.W. Olin Foundation ($ today). It is four stories high, with  containing thousands of volumes, periodicals, serials, electronic resources, a number of special collections, and hundreds of compact discs, DVDs, and videotapes. From 1909 until 2011, the library was a federal government documents repository. Olin still provides access to hundreds of online government resources.  Olin Library was one of three recipients of the 2013 ACRL Excellence in Academic Libraries Award.

In 2021, Olin Library collaborated with Rollins' Department of Art & Art History and the Rollins Museum of Art to establish the Rollins Book Arts Collection, an interdisciplinary teaching collection, directly supporting the College’s curriculum and its long tradition of liberal education. The purpose of the collection is to use art as a medium through which students can better understand multifaceted issues — global politics, economies, cultures; the tensions around social structures and marginalized populations; conflicts between human development and the environment; art as a concept, expression, and a communication tool; and other contemporary issues that students will encounter in their coursework and everyday lives. It can be accessed in the reading room of Olin Library's Archives and Special Collections.

Olin Electronic Research and Information Center
The Olin Electronic Research and Information Center was also established in 1998 with a second gift of US$2.7 million from the F.W. Olin Foundation ($ today). The center features the latest technology, including computer stations, color printers, scanners, audio and video digitizers, compact discs, videodiscs, and videotapes. These tools facilitate creativity as students pursue research questions, prepare multimedia presentations, and create Web pages.

Origins as a "Carnegie Library"
Olin Libraries' collection is one of the oldest and most extensive in Central Florida, dating back (1909-1951) to its Carnegie Library founding as one of the original 14 Florida libraries funded by Andrew Carnegie. The original collection, at the founding of Rollins College in 1885, consisted of one Christian Bible and one dictionary. According to Cohen (2006), Carnegie's "donation of 108 libraries to colleges in the first two decades of the twentieth century assisted 10% of the institutions of higher learning in the United States. Carnegie had a preference for colleges and universities that served African-American students, which Rollins College president William Fremont Blackman noted the school did in a letter to Carnegie appealing for a library in 1904:

Blackman's request consisted of $35,000 in total ($ today): "$20,000 for a fireproof building, $3,000 for books, and $12,000 as an endowment for the continued purchase of books" ($, $ and $ today respectively). Blackman received a response from Carnegie's secretary James Bertram that noted the request was too general for consideration, and that Carnegie would need a profile of the university before consideration. Little progress was made for over a year, when Blackman again wrote to Carnegie, noting the university's need for a library. Trustees and friends of the university wrote to Carnegie on Blackman's behalf, including W.W. Cummer, a trustee from Jacksonville who served on the board of the city's new Carnegie Library. A letter dated 22 June 1905 and written from Carnegie's home in Scotland brought the welcome news of the offer of a library. Carnegie offered $20,000 ($ today) for the construction of a library provided that the same amount would be raised for the library's upkeep. While grateful for Carnegie's proposal, Blackman was uneasy with its terms because the amount of funding required to match Carnegie's offer would put a strain on those who had donated to start the college's endowment fund of $200,000 as well as paid a debt of $30,000 ($ combined today). In correspondence to Bertram dated July 11, 1905, Blackman wrote (according to Cohen):

In a January 1906 letter Blackman wrote to Carnegie expressing concern about meeting the conditions for the gift, noting that the college had a large debt that took "considerable self-sacrifice on the part of our friends." That summer, another Florida college, Stetson University, was awarded $40,000 ($ today) for a library from Carnegie. Upon learning this Blackman again wrote to Carnegie, seeking to amend the original terms of the agreement to match the amount that Stetson was awarded. He was turned down, but a year later was able to notify Carnegie that the school's trustees had been able to match the $20,000 necessary for the gift to be awarded. Bertram wrote to Blackman to inform him that Carnegie had "authorized his Cashier…to arrange payments on Library Building, as work progresses, to the extent of Twenty Thousand Dollars." ($ today) The library, to be named Carnegie Hall, was dedicated on February 18, 1909.

The building had over 8,000 square feet of space, and was the school's first dedicated library building. It served as a library from 1909 until 1951. In addition to its function as a library, Carnegie Hall also served as the school's post office. Since the library was moved from Carnegie to the newly built Mills Memorial Library, it has also housed a bookstore, admissions office, faculty offices, and human resources office.

Archibald Granville Bush Science Center
The Bush Science Center at Rollins has state of the art SMART classrooms, faculty offices, and 38 teaching and research laboratories for the physical and behavioral sciences, mathematics, and computer science. The science center is where Donald J. Cram launched his chemical studies, becoming the 1987 Nobel Prize winner in Chemistry.  Construction of the redesign of the Archibald Granville Bush Science Center began in the spring of 2012 and was completed prior to the beginning of the fall 2013 semester.  The science center, which has 103,580 square feet and cost $30 million to upgrade ($ today), is now the largest building at Rollins. It has three floors and includes 51 offices, 15 classrooms, 15 teaching labs, 19 research labs and 18 student/faculty lounges.

Rollins Museum of Art
The Cornell Fine Arts Museum is located on school grounds and contains works of art and objects from antiquity to the 21st century. The museum was built instead of what would have been the Ackland Art Museum at Rollins; millionaire and amateur art collector William Hayes Ackland (1855-1940) wanted to leave his fortune to a Southern university for an art museum and narrowed his choices to Duke University, the University of North Carolina at Chapel Hill, and Rollins, in that order. After Ackland's death, Duke refused the request, and UNC and Rollins, excised from Ackland's final will, both brought suit to locate Ackland's museum on their campuses. In a case that went to the United States Supreme Court, Ackland's trustees sided with UNC, but a lower court ruled for Rollins; a higher court finally granted the bequest to UNC. Rollins was represented in the case by former U.S. attorney general Homer Cummings.

Annie Russell Theatre
The Annie Russell Theatre is a historic theater in Winter Park, Florida, located on the premises of Rollins College. The theatre was named after the English-born actress Annie Russell in 1931, who taught at Rollins until she died of lung disease in 1936. It was designed by the architect Richard Kiehnel of Kiehnel and Elliott.  In October 1998, it was added to the National Register of Historic Places.

Knowles Memorial Chapel

The Knowles Memorial Chapel is a historic chapel on the Rollins campus. In February 1998, it was added to the National Register of Historic Places.

Ground was broken for the chapel on March 9, 1931, and the cornerstone was laid on May 12 of the same year. The dedication service for the chapel took place just a year later on March 29, 1932.  Though founded by a Congregational Church educational committee, Rollins has no religious affiliation, so the chapel is interdenominational. A Protestant service is held on Sunday mornings, and Catholic Mass is held on Sunday evenings.

A highlight of the chapel is a circular window of the seven liberal arts designed by Ralph Adams Cram and William Herbert Burnham.

Walk of Fame
The Rollins Walk of Fame, which circles Mills lawn, consists of stones taken from places connected to historic people. Past college president Hamilton Holt came up with the idea in the 1920s, and based the Walk of Fame on the "ancestral walk" at his home in Connecticut. The idea, Holt wrote, was "unique in conception and execution."

Holt officially dedicated the Walk of Fame in October 1929, originally calling it the Memorial Path of Fame. Holt presented 22 stones, including stones from the homes of American luminaries George Washington, Henry Wadsworth Longfellow, Daniel Webster, Calvin Coolidge, and Ralph Waldo Emerson. Early additions to the Walk of Fame were predominantly American, but later additions would include stones from places associated with internationally famous figures as diverse as St. Augustine, Emperor Humayun, and William Wordsworth. By 1932 the Walk of Fame had over 200 stones, many of which Holt himself had brought back to campus: the Charles Dickens stone he had picked up while visiting Gad's Hill, and he claimed that the Mohammed stone was brought back from Mecca by a student's sister, "at the risk of fine and imprisonment."

After Holt retired as president of the college in 1949, there no longer existed a central authority for the Walk of Fame, and over the next two decades stones began to disappear, often around graduation time; many were thrown into Lake Virginia. Only in the 1980s, under the presidency of Thaddeus Seymour (president from 1978 to 1990), was there an Official Lapidarian responsible for taking care of the stones. As of 2003, the Walk of Fame had about 530 stones, the vast majority (455) honoring men. Most stones are associated with specific people, but a few—like the stones from Australia and the Berlin Wall—honor places or events.

Academics
Rollins has three divisions that offer a variety of programs: College of Arts and Sciences; Crummer Graduate School of Business; and Hamilton Holt School.

US News states that undergraduates at Rollins can choose from about 30 majors, ranging from Latin American and Caribbean studies to computer science and biochemistry to theatre arts and dance. In addition to its undergraduate programs, Rollins offers an M.B.A. program through the Crummer Graduate School of Business. Other graduate degrees granted include Master of Public Health (MPH), Master of Arts in teaching, Master of Education in elementary education, Master of Human Resources, and Master of Liberal Studies.  Its most popular undergraduate majors, by number out of 593 graduates in 2022, were:
Business Administration and Management (120)
Communication (63)
International Business/Trade/Commerce (56)
Psychology (50)
Music (30)

Admissions
Rollins' admissions process is "more selective" according to U.S. News & World Report.

For the class entering Fall 2018, 3,635 freshmen were accepted out of 5,455 applicants, a 66.6% acceptance rate, and 549 enrolled.  Fall 2018 enrolling students had an average GPA of 3.31; the middle 50% range of SAT scores was 590–680 for reading and writing, and 560–680 for math, while the ACT Composite range was 24–30.  Women constituted 58.3% of the incoming freshmen class, men 41.7%.

Rankings

Rollins earned the first overall spot on U.S. News & World Reports 2021 "Best Regional Universities South Rankings." The college was also named No. 1 for "Best Undergraduate Teaching" and 14th for "Best Value Schools" in the Regional Universities South category.

According to U.S. News & World Reports 2020 "Best Regional Universities South Rankings," Rollins is ranked first overall in the southern United States out of 136 regional schools whose highest degree is a Master's, first for "Best Undergraduate Teaching", tied for fourth for "Most Innovative Schools", seventh for "Best Value", and tied for 87th in "Top Performers on Social Mobility".

The college has also been named one of the top national producers of Fulbright Scholars among Masters granting institutions throughout the U.S.  Since inception of the scholarship in 1951, 48 Rollins students have been awarded the prestigious honor, .

College of Arts and Sciences

In 2010, the College of Arts and Sciences and the College of Professional Studies have a total of 1,884 students and a student to faculty ratio of 10 to 1.

Crummer Graduate School of Business
The Rollins College Crummer Graduate School of Business offers a Masters in Business Administration (MBA) through three different programs:

 The Early Advantage MBA Program is a full-time day program designed for recent college graduates with little to no work experience. Students can complete the program within 16 to 21 months. 
 The Professional MBA Program is a 24-27-month program designed for students with a wide range of educational and professional experience. 
 The Executive MBA Program is designed for mid-to senior-level professionals who prefer a blend of online and Saturday classes. It can be completed in 15 months.

The Rollins MBA programs are listed in several national rankings of business schools, including:
Forbes: 44th in the Nation (2017)
Leadership Excellence: #1 in Florida (2018)

As of 2018, the Rollins Full-Time and Part-Time MBA programs are listed as Rank Not Published, or "RNP".
The bottom quarter of rank-eligible full-time MBA programs are listed as Rank Not Published.
Rank Not Published means that U.S. News calculated a numerical rank for that program but decided for editorial reasons not to publish it.

The Rollins MBA is accredited by the Association to Advance Collegiate Schools of Business.

Hamilton Holt School
Adult education courses at Rollins were initially only offered to returning World War II veterans. On September 7, 1960, the executive committee of the Board of Trustees of Rollins College gave formal authorization for the Institute for General Studies to award degrees upon completion of program requirements. On November 6, 1987, the school's name was changed to The Hamilton Holt School, in honor of Rollins’ eighth president.

The Hamilton Holt School offers Bachelor of Arts degrees in a variety of majors as well as several graduate degrees. Its focus is on the non-traditional student, identified as a working individual seeking professional advancement and therefore schedules most courses in the evenings and on weekends.

Special programs

Rollins College Conference (RCC)
The Rollins College Conference, taken in the first semester of a student's freshman year, is required of all non-transfer students in the College of Arts and Sciences. The course serves as both an orientation course and a topic course in a student's area of interest.  The professor for this course will serve as the enrolled students' academic advisor until they select a major and choose a new advisor from the corresponding department.  One or two peer mentors (upperclassmen with special training) join the course and offer counseling and support to the new students.

Honors Degree Program
The Honors Degree Program allows the top students in each entering class of the College of Arts and Sciences to complete a series of special interdisciplinary seminars, which replace approximately two-thirds of the school's general education requirements. To earn an honors degree, students must also complete a thesis in their major field during their junior and senior years.

Accelerated Management Program (AMP)
The Accelerated Management Program allows selected students to earn both a BA from the College of Arts and Sciences and an MBA from the Crummer Graduate School of Business in a total of five years.  Students enrolled in this program must complete all general education and major/minor requirements prior to the conclusion of their third year.  In their fourth year, students take courses from the Early Advantage MBA program, from which credits are applied to both their undergraduate and graduate transcripts.  Upon completion of the fourth year, AMP students graduate from the College of Arts and Sciences and walk with their class at commencement.  In the fifth year, students complete the MBA degree and graduate a second time.

International programs
All three schools at Rollins offer international courses to destinations such as London, Sydney, and Madrid, among others.  Some programs are offered directly through Rollins, while others are offered through partnerships with other colleges and universities.  Students may study abroad for a week or an entire semester.

Athletics

Rollins participates in NCAA Division II's Sunshine State Conference for the majority of its sports; the college's women's lacrosse program competes as a DII independent program. The rowing teams compete in the Southern Intercollegiate Rowing Association and Florida Intercollegiate Rowing Association while the sailing squad competes in the South Atlantic Intercollegiate Sailing Association. The Rollins water skiing teams compete in NCAA Division I, the only school program to do so. Rollins' athletic teams are called the Tars (an archaic name for a sailor). Rollins' Athletic Tradition includes 23 National Championships and 67 Sunshine State Conference titles. The school sponsors twenty-three varsity teams: The most successful sport in the history of Rollins is Women's Golf.  They have 13 national championship titles. In 1950 and 1956, Betty Rowland and Marlene Stewart Streit, respectively, won the women's individual intercollegiate golf championship (an event conducted by the Division of Girls' and Women's Sports (DGWS) — which later evolved into the current NCAA women's golf championship). In later years, Bettina Walker (1988, 1989), Debbie Pappas (1990, 1991, 1992), Mariana De Biase (2006) and Joanna Coe (2008) also became individual national champions at the Small College and NCAA Division II levels.

Campus life
Rollins College is located in Winter Park, a few minutes from downtown Orlando. There are more than 150 student clubs and organizations on campus, including a wakeboard club and ballroom dance club. The Tars, Rollins's athletic teams, compete in the NCAA Division II Sunshine State Conference and field a varsity waterskiing team among others. A sizeable Greek life on campus comprises more than 10 fraternities and sororities. About 75 percent of students live on campus in one of the residence halls or apartment complexes. In addition, there are weekly shuttles, "Rolly Trolly", to provide transport to a shopping area for the students.

Fox Day 
Fox Day is an annual tradition at Rollins. Since 1956 (except during the tenure of President Jack Critchfield, 1969–1978), each spring, the president cancels all classes, providing undergraduate students with a surprise day off to explore local beaches and amusement parks, together as a college, returning in the late afternoon for a barbecue. It's known as Fox Day, because a statue of a fox is placed on Mills Lawn (the school's main lawn), signifying the day off.

The fox statue, originally accompanied with a cat statue were a gift from Senator Murray Sams in 1934 to President Hamilton Holt as he thought it would be "fittingly enshrined" at Rollins. They originally came from France, and believed to be satirical pieces, depicting, "the Populace (Cat) making his sweeping bow in hypocritical salute to the Papacy (Fox). The statues were placed on pedestals near the old Recreational Hall which is now replaced by the pool.  Holt created a "Cat Society" for women and a "Fox Society" for men, these groups consisted of four people each, selected by an annual vote by the opposite gender of the student body for the opposite group.  The statues were only allowed to be touched by the respective privileged members. Occasionally, the statues were taken and hidden as practical jokes. However, the cat statue had been mysteriously destroyed in 1949 with the location of the remains unknown.  Since then, the fox is hidden and only brought out for Fox Day.

During Fox Day season 2015, a petition was widely circulated to include Holt and Crummer students in the popular tradition. Currently, these students are not excused from classes, limiting their involvement in the annual festivities; furthering the disconnect between the evening and graduate students on campus. In March 2020, the campus shut down and sent students home as a result of the COVID-19 pandemic, resulting in no Fox Day occurrence during the 2019–2020 academic year.

Winter Park Bach Festival
Since 1935, the Winter Park Bach Festival, the third-oldest continuously operating Bach festival in the United States, has brought some of the highest caliber of classical performers from around the world to campus, for a two-week event. The 150-voice Bach Festival Society is regarded as one of the finest oratorio societies in America.

WPRK 91.5 The Best in Basement Radio
WPRK 91.5 FM the Best in Basement Radio is a non-commercial college radio station located in Winter Park, Florida, owned and operated by Rollins College. Its signal is audible in most of the Orlando metropolitan area, or from Seaworld to Sanford as said by DJs on-air.

Notable alumni

In popular culture
After a speaking appearance at Rollins in 1988, Kurt Vonnegut used it as one of the models for the school in Hocus Pocus in which Rollins is the former place of employment of the fictional school's president.

See also
Rollins College Interracial Committee
William Phillips Hall, a one time trustee and director of the college.

References

External links

 
 Official athletics website
 Rollins Collegiate Wear at A History of Central Florida Podcast

 
Buildings and structures in Winter Park, Florida
Educational institutions established in 1885
Library buildings completed in 1909
Universities and colleges accredited by the Southern Association of Colleges and Schools
Universities and colleges in Orange County, Florida
1885 establishments in Florida
Private universities and colleges in Florida